Quytul (also, Getul’, Gotul, and Guytul) is a village and the least populous municipality in the Dashkasan Rayon of Azerbaijan.  It has a population of 33.

References 

Populated places in Dashkasan District